Marion is a city in Grant County, Indiana, United States. The population was 28,310 as of the 2020 United States Census. The city is the county seat of Grant County. It is named for Francis Marion, a brigadier general from South Carolina in the American Revolutionary War.

The city is home to Indiana Wesleyan University, the largest evangelical Christian university in the Midwest and Indiana's largest private university, when online and regional campuses in Indiana, Kentucky, Ohio, and Illinois are included. The traditional campus enrolls about 2,800 students. Since 2016, Jess Alumbaugh has been Marion's mayor.

Marion is the birthplace of actor James Dean and cartoonist Jim Davis. It was the location of the wedding of actress Julia Roberts and singer Lyle Lovett in 1993.

Geography
Marion is located along the Mississinewa River.

Demographics

2010 census
As of the 2010 United States Census, there were 29,948 people, 11,828 households, and 6,739 families in the city. The racial makeup of the city was 78.1% White, 14.7% African American, 0.4% Native American, 0.7% Asian, 2.4% from other races, and 3.6% from two or more races. Hispanic or Latino of any race were 5.5% of the population.

There were 11,828 households, of which 27.9% had children under the age of 18 living with them, 35.2% were married couples living together, 17.0% had a female householder with no husband present, 4.8% had a male householder with no wife present, and 43.0% were non-families. 36.7% of all households were made up of individuals, and 14.7% had someone living alone who was 65 years of age or older. The average household size was 2.25 and the average family size was 2.91.

The median age in the city was 36.2 years. 21.1% of residents were under the age of 18; 16.3% were between the ages of 18 and 24; 22.1% were from 25 to 44; 24.5% were from 45 to 64; and 16% were 65 years of age or older. The gender makeup of the city was 47.0% male and 53.0% female.

2000 census
As of the 2000 United States Census, of 2000, there were 31,320 residents. The racial makeup of the city was 79.64% White, 15.57% African American, 0.47% Native American, 0.68% Asian, 0.02% Pacific Islander, 1.43% from other races, and 2.18% from two or more races.  3.60% of the population were Hispanic or Latino of any race.

There were 12,462 households, out of which 27.3% had children under the age of 18 living with them, 42.1% were married couples living together, 14.7% had a female householder with no husband present, and 38.8% were non-families. 33.8% of all households were made up of individuals, and 14.2% had someone living alone who was 65 years of age or older.  The average household size was 2.30 and the average family size was 2.91.

The city population contained 23.3% under the age of 18, 12.5% from 18 to 24, 26.0% from 25 to 44, 21.3% from 45 to 64, and 17.0% over 64 years. The median age was 36 years.  For every 100 females, there were 88.6 males.  For every 100 females age 18 and over, there were 84.1 males.

The median income for a household in the city was $30,440, and the median income for a family was $37,717. Males had a median income of $30,258 versus $23,467 for females. The per capita income for the city wa $16,378. 16.9% of the population and 12.6% of families were below the poverty line.  Out of the total population, 23.8% of those under the age of 18 and 11.3% of those 65 and older were living below the poverty line.

History
The Battle of the Mississinewa was fought in December 1812, north of the current city of Marion, as an expeditionary force sent by William Henry Harrison against the Miami villages. Today, the battle is reenacted every fall by residents of Grant County and many reenactors and enthusiasts from throughout the United States and Canada during the annual "Mississinewa 1812" festival, the largest War of 1812 reenactment in the United States.

The Grant County Jail and Sheriff's Residence, Abijah C. Jay House, Marion Branch, National Home for Disabled Volunteer Soldiers Historic District, Marion Downtown Commercial Historic District, Aaron Swayzee House, George, Jr. and Marie Daugherty Webster House, and J. Woodrow Wilson House are listed on the National Register of Historic Places.

Founding
When Martin Boots and David Branson each donated  of land in 1831 for the site of Marion, they chose a location on the left bank of the swift, scenic river which the Miami Indians had named "Mississinewa," meaning "Falling water."

With the formation of Grant County in 1831, Marion was established as the county seat and its future was assured. The river provided water supply, power, and drainage as it flowed at the base of the nearby hills. Along with at least 36 other communities in the nation, Marion was named for the Revolutionary War General Francis Marion, the "Swamp Fox" of South Carolina.

Gas boom and growth

Marion grew slowly for more than 50 years as an agricultural trading center supported by a sprinkling of small farm- and forest-related industries.

In the 1880s, fields of natural gas were discovered across much of east-central Indiana, and Grant County began to grow at a dizzying pace during the Indiana gas boom. Gas City and Matthews were carved out of raw farmland and launched as speculative boom towns, each absorbing existing tiny villages. They attracted several thousand residents before the gas reserves were tapped and most industries left. As late as the 1940s, Matthews resembled a Western ghost town, before it attracted eleven glass factories and drew the professional baseball team away from Indianapolis. Grant County's only covered bridge remains there as a link to the past.

However, the gas boom left its legacy. A few industries remained, particularly glass manufacturers.

National Home for Disabled Volunteer Soldiers
On July 23, 1888, with increasing number of residents at the six HDVS, Congress established a seventh home in Grant County (and ultimately three more). It is known as the Marion Branch. Congress allotted an appropriation of $200,000 for construction, while Grant County residents provided a natural gas supply for heating and lighting. Marion was selected as a site for the new branch due to the availability of natural gas and the political support of Colonel George Washington Steele, US Congressman serving from 1880 to 1890.

This facility is now a part of the Veterans Administration (VA) Northern Indiana Health Care System, a dual-campus facility associated with the former VA Medical Center Fort Wayne. In the early 21st century, the original treatment hospital, built in 1889, the greenhouse, and cadet quarters are scheduled for demolition. There has been a lack of public support for funding restoration of these buildings. As they do not meet current standards, the Veterans Administration plans to demolish the buildings and replace them.

In the late 20th century, Marion surveyed its significant properties and defined the main buildings and grounds of the hospital as the Marion Branch Historic District. It is located at the intersection of 38th Street and Lincoln Boulevard, approximately 2½ miles southeast of the center of Marion. The boundaries are 38th Street on the north, the railroad right-of-way on the east, the Mississinewa River on the southeast, Chambers Park on the south and southeast, and Lincoln Boulevard to the west. The  site is roughly square in form with diagonal boundary lines on the southeast and the southwest eliminating those corners of the square. Originally, farming operations on the Home grounds included the area that is now Chambers Park.

In 1981, a Determination of Eligibility for the National Register of Historic Places for Federal Properties was made under Criteria A and C. As a result, since 1981, various projects have been reviewed by the Indiana State Preservation Office for compliance under Section 106 of the National Historic Preservation Act of 1966, as amended. In 1992, the historic district was surveyed by the Indiana Department of Natural Resources as a component of the Grant County inventory of historic sites and structures.

Baseball
From 1900 to 1901, Marion had their own baseball team called the Glass Blowers.

1930 lynching

Two African-American men were lynched in Marion on August 7, 1930. A large, mostly white mob estimated at 5,000 gathered at the county jail where three young black men were held on charges of killing a white man and raping his girlfriend. Before they could be tried, the three, Thomas Shipp, Abram Smith, and James Cameron, were dragged from the jail and severely beaten. Shipp and Smith were hanged to death. Cameron was saved when an unidentified woman said he had nothing to do with the crimes.

The woman retracted her accusation of rape. In 1931 Cameron was convicted as an accessory to murder and served four years before being paroled. He became educated and worked as a civil rights activist, later serving as the Indiana State Director of Civil Liberties from 1942 to 1950. He also founded three local chapters of the NAACP, and served as the first president of the Madison County, Indiana chapter. In 1988 he founded America’s Black Holocaust Museum in Milwaukee to preserve the history of African Americans who had faced the terror and violence of lynching. In 1993, James Cameron received an official apology and a full pardon from the state of Indiana. Cameron later said, "Since the state of Indiana forgave me, I forgive the state of Indiana." In 2005, the US Senate also officially apologized to Cameron and families of the victims of lynchings. The event in Marion was notable as the last confirmed lynching of African Americans in Indiana and the Northern United States.

Mid 20th-century industrial development
Marion's prosperity plateaued between the end of the gas boom, just prior to World War I, and 1955. But construction of a General Motors stamping and tool plant created many new jobs. The city grew rapidly. Except for bedroom communities near metropolitan centers, Marion's growth during the 1950s exceeded all but one Indiana city with populations of 10,000-100,000.

Marion today
One of Marion's more notable architectural landmarks is the extensive Marion High School campus, which includes a 1,468-seat community auditorium, home of the Marion Philharmonic Orchestra, the Community School for the Arts, and the Mississinewa Valley Community Band. The city has a lending library, the Marion Public Library.

The eight-time state basketball champions, Marion Giants, play in the 7,500 seat Bill Green Athletic Arena. The city operates a  Riverwalk from downtown to Matter Park, and there is a newly renovated $9,000,000 YMCA Memorial Coliseum to honor war veterans. This was the previous home of the Giants, which was built after their first State Basketball Title in 1926.
 
A publicly owned mansion, the Hostess House, is used for social functions, and Marion General Hospital has been nationally accredited for approximately a half-century. Marion General was recently named a magnet hospital.

Economy
Marion's manufacturing sector produces automotive components, paper products, foundry products, machinery, wire, and cable. The paper plate industry was born in Marion; in its infancy, five of the nation's nine plants were located in the city.

The area surrounding Marion is part of the Corn Belt; as such, agriculture remains a significant component of the region's economy. Corn, soybean, and hog production are supplemented by specialty crops such as tomatoes.

Thomson SA's Marion facility was shuttered in 2004, leaving the city in an economic slump. On June 13, 2007, the Thomson building's northern portion was destroyed by a fire. Other Marion plant closures in the past few decades include those of Ball-Foster, SCM (later Ampad) Paper Company, and the Malleable Iron Works (both on the far west side along Miller Avenue). The city has made inroads in attracting new businesses in the mid to late 2000s, however. Marion has been the only Midwest community selected as one of the Top 100 Micro-Enterprises for Economic Development by Site Selection Magazine for the years 2007 and 2008. TriEnda Plastics LLC selection of Marion in 2008 was one of the top 5 Manufacturing Projects in Indiana and received the coveted Silver Shovel award from Area Development Magazine. By spring 2011, TriEnda has ceased production. In the last ten years over $1,113,000 has been invested by private sector employers in Marion (source local newspaper).

Christmas City U.S.A.
Christmas City U.S.A. is a local non-profit organization promoting the Christmas season in Marion and Grant County. It organizes and sponsors the Annual Christmas Parade on the Saturday before Thanksgiving to kick off the Holiday season.

It began in 1965 when the organization had a vision to expand the holiday season beyond the traditional cards and private parties. Directors wanted to foster human relations among residents of all ages and public relations toward nonresidents. In 1970, Christmas City and the Chamber of Commerce joined forces to promote a new look for the city. Postcards, bumper stickers, billboards were designed to establish the city as Christmas City U.S.A. The name was even trademarked to preserve the city's identity. In 1991, Mayor Ron Mowery, Mark Erlewine, and a group of interested citizens decided to make Marion live up to its name. By combining the Mississinewa Riverwalk—the  walkway which is used year around for jogging, walking and more—and holiday lights and lighted displays, the Christmas City Walkway of Lights was established in 1992.

Transportation
The Marion Municipal Airport is three nautical miles (4 mi, 6 km) southwest of Marion's central business district.

Notable people
 Jolly Blackburn, cartoonist, writer, creator of Knights of the Dinner Table
 Case Broderick, politician
 Chad Curtis, former professional baseball player
 Jim Davis, creator of Garfield, the lasagna-loving comic strip cat; (Davis's studio, Paws, Inc., is located near Muncie, Indiana)
 James Dean, iconic actor, born in Marion
 Willis Van Devanter, former Supreme Court Justice
 Mildred Dilling, harpist
 Jim Gallagher, Jr., professional golfer, golf analyst for USA Network
Samuel Levi Jones (born 1978), painter, assemblage artist
 Jeff King, former professional baseball player, Pittsburgh Pirates and Kansas City Royals
 Kenesaw Mountain Landis, first Commissioner of Baseball, practiced law in Marion
 Mike Melvill, the first commercial astronaut
 Keith O'Conner Murphy, Sweetser, IN, Rockabilly Hall of Fame, singer-songwriter, Stacy and King Records (USA)  Polydor Records, England
 Stretch Murphy, Hall of Fame basketball player
 William N. Oatis, Associated Press correspondent detained 1951–1953 by Communist government of Czechoslovakia
 Joseph Price, professional  basketball player, NBA Washington Bullets. Former  NCAA  head basketball coach at Grambling State University
 Zach Randolph, former professional basketball player, Memphis Grizzlies
Amber Richards, transgender female impersonator, television personality, and winner of the Miss Continental pageant. 
 Wayne Seybold, former Marion mayor and pairs skater at 1988 Winter Olympics
 Caleb Blood Smith, Secretary of the Interior under President Abraham Lincoln and served as a prosecuting attorney in Marion
 George Washington Steele, Indiana Congressman and first governor of the Oklahoma Territory
 Monte Towe, North Carolina State Wolfpack National Champions 1974, Chicago Bulls, NCAA coach
 Bertha L. Turner, caterer, cookbook author, and community leader in Pasadena; raised in Marion
 Jan Wiley, actress

See also
 National Home For Disabled Volunteer Soldiers, Marion Branch

References

External links

 
Cities in Indiana
Cities in Grant County, Indiana
Micropolitan areas of Indiana
County seats in Indiana